Ivan Oleksandrovich Bidnyak (October 1, 1985, Marganets, Dnipropetrovsk Region, Ukrainian SSR, USSR — April 20, 2022, Kherson region, Ukraine ) — Ukrainian shooter, master of sports of international class of Ukraine in bullseye shooting. A senior soldier of the Armed Forces of Ukraine, a participant in the Russian-Ukrainian war, who fell during the Russian invasion of Ukraine.

Biography 
In 2003, he graduated from the Lviv State School of Physical Culture (shooting department) and returned to Dnipropetrovsk.

Took second place in shooting from a small-caliber pistol (MP-6 exercise) at the 26th ISAS international tournament, Dortmund, with a score of 657.0 points.

In March 2010, he won a silver medal as part of the team at the European shooting championship in the city of Meraker (Norway) — shooting from an air pistol at 10 meters (exercise PP-3) — together with Serhiy Kudreya (Kherson) and Oleg Omelchuk (Rivne)

In 2010, he was recognized as the eighth in the top ten sportsmen of the Dnipropetrovsk region (3 bronze medals in the European shooting Championship).

At the 2010 ISSF World Shooting Championships, his 7th-place finish in the 10meter air pistol earned Ukraine's first shooting quota place to the 2012 Olympic Games.

In the summer of 2013, he won a silver award at the European Small Arms Shooting Championship in Osijek — from a distance of 25 meters, with a result of 575 points. In the team tournament, Roman Bondaruk together with Oleksandr Petriv and Ivan Bidniak won bronze awards — 1706 points.

In February 2022, at the beginning of the invasion of Russian troops into Ukraine, he returned from abroad, where he worked, and went to the front as a volunteer. He fought in the Kherson region . On April 20, 2022, he was killed by an enemy bullet while performing a combat mission.

Awards 

 Order "For Courage" III degree (2022) — for personal courage and selfless actions shown in the defense of the state sovereignty and territorial integrity of Ukraine, loyalty to the military oath.

References

External links

Sources 

 UNIAN 
 Lviv State School of Physical Culture 
 Bullet Shooting 
 The first Ukrainian license for the 2012 Olympics 
 VRU 
 Shooting Federation of Ukraine 

Webarchive template wayback links
1985 births
2022 deaths
Ukrainian sportsmen
People from Dnipropetrovsk Oblast
Ukrainian military personnel killed in the 2022 Russian invasion of Ukraine